Titabaira, New South Wales is a remote rural locality of Central Darling Shire and civil parish of Tandora County located at 32°15′01″S 142°28′48″E on the Menindee Lakes. It is located to the north west of the Darling River, to the area to the north of Menindee.

References

Parishes of Tandora County
Localities in New South Wales